John-Paul Pirrello (born 27 December 1984; in Sydney, Australia), known onstage as Outbreak, is an Australian DJ and music producer. Since 2002, he has been active in producing and performing hard dance music, specifically hardstyle since 2002.

Biography
In his initial years, JP Pirrello performed under the name NitrouZ and released tracks "City Bitch", "Crazy Music" with DJ Duro and "Lonely Dark" with Zany, which were picked up among many fans worldwide. During these years, he released his music on a number of labels including Dutch Master Works and Fusion Records. As NitrouZ, Pirrello performed at many parties in Australia and The Netherlands such as Defqon.1 Festival, Dance Valley, Q-Dance: The Next Level, X-Qlusive Showtek, Q-BASE, Euphoria and many more.

In 2013, the alias NitrouZ was discontinued and Pirrello re-launched himself as Outbreak, signing to Brennan Heart's record label, WE R Music and representing its sub-label WE R Raw. Outbreak quickly established himself in the Hardstyle scene by releasing popular tracks "A New Today," "Get The Mean" with DV8 Rocks!, his official remix of Adaro's "Hit You With That Bang Shit" and "#Bassface," which gained over 500,000 plays in total on YouTube.

Outbreak has had many performances in some of the biggest venues in The Netherlands including the Ziggo Dome, Heineken Music Hall, Jaarbeurs (Utrecht), GelreDome and the Brabanthallen as well as many outdoor venues. Since beginning the Outbreak project, JP has performed at some of the biggest Hard dance events such as Hard Bass, Defqon.1 (Australia and The Netherlands), Qapital, Masters of Hardcore, Decibel Outdoor Festival, The Qontinent, Q-BASE and many other large-scale events run by leading companies Q-Dance, Bass Events and b2s.

Discography

References

External links 
 
 http://www.wer-music.com

1984 births
Australian DJs
Hardstyle musicians
Living people
Musicians from Sydney
Electronic dance music DJs